2011 Thespa Kusatsu season.

J2 League

References

External links
 J.League official site

Thespa Kusatsu
Thespakusatsu Gunma seasons